Giorgi Dekanosidze (born 2 January 1981, in Tbilisi) is a retired Georgian professional football midfielder and current manager of Dinamo Tbilisi.

1981 births
Living people
Footballers from Georgia (country)
FC WIT Georgia players
Expatriate footballers from Georgia (country)
Georgia (country) international footballers
Expatriate footballers in Germany
SpVgg Greuther Fürth players
FC Ameri Tbilisi players
FC Metalurgi Rustavi players
FC Sioni Bolnisi players
FC Kolkheti-1913 Poti players
Association football midfielders